Richard Dalton may refer to:

 Richard Dalton (canoeist) (born 1979), Irish-born, Canadian sprint canoer
 Richard Dalton (cricketer) (born 1965), former English cricketer
 Sir Richard Dalton (diplomat) (born 1948), British diplomat
 Richard Dalton (editor), former editor of the Whole Earth Software Catalog
 Richard Dalton (librarian) (c. 1715–1791), English engraver and art dealer for George III
 Richard J. Dalton (born 1972), American electronic dance music DJ